Rafan Sidibé (born 12 March 1984) is a Malian former professional footballer who played as a forward.

Club career
Born in Bamako, Sidibé played for JS Centre Salif Keita and Stade Malien in his native Mali before moving to Algeria where he joined MC Alger of the Algerian Championnat National in 2005. On 20 February 2006, while playing for MC Alger in the return leg of the Arab Champions League 2005–06 quarterfinals against ENPPI Club, Sidibé suffered a double fracture of the tibia. He underwent surgery the next day but was sidelined until 10 January 2007, when he came back scoring a goal in a friendly against Fiorentina.

After three years with MC Alger Sidibé signed with league rivals MSP Batna. After one season with MSP Batna, he signed with Olympic Safi in the Moroccan Botola.

International career
Sidibé was part of the Malian 2004 Summer Olympics football team, which exited in the quarter finals, finishing top of group A, but losing to France in the next round.

References

External links
 
 
 
 

1984 births
Living people
Sportspeople from Bamako
Malian footballers
Association football forwards
Footballers at the 2004 Summer Olympics
Olympic footballers of Mali
JS Centre Salif Keita players
Stade Malien players
MC Alger players
MSP Batna players
Olympic Club de Safi players
Djoliba AC players
AS Bamako players
Malian expatriate footballers
Malian expatriate sportspeople in Algeria
Expatriate footballers in Algeria
Malian expatriate sportspeople in Morocco
Expatriate footballers in Morocco
21st-century Malian people